The  class was a class of three battlecruisers of the Imperial German Navy. The ships were ordered for the 1912–13 Naval Building Program of the German Imperial Navy as a reply to the Royal Navy's two new s that had been launched a few years earlier. The preceding  and the incrementally improved  represented the end of the evolution of Germany's first generation of battlecruisers. The  class had considerable improvements, including a larger primary armament, all of which was mounted on the centerline. The ships were also larger than the preceding classes. The  class used a similar propulsion system, and as a result of the increased displacement were slightly slower.

Rear Admiral Ludwig von Reuter, who was in command of the interned High Seas Fleet, ordered the ships to be scuttled in an attempt to prevent their possible seizure by the Royal Navy.

Design 
The -class battlecruisers were a result of the fourth and final Naval Law, which was passed in 1912. Admiral Alfred von Tirpitz used public outcry over the British involvement in the Agadir Crisis of 1911 to pressure the Reichstag into appropriating additional funds to the Navy. The Fourth Naval Law secured funding for three new dreadnoughts, two light cruisers, and an extra 15,000 officers and men in the Navy for 1912. Design work on the first two ships began in October 1910 and continued until June 1911;  was built to a slightly modified design, which was created between May and October 1912.

When design work began, the navy department was asked to submit new requirements to fix deficiencies found in the preceding battlecruiser classes, which primarily covered propulsion systems and the main armament. Previous battlecruisers used a four shaft arrangement for their engines; reducing the number to three would allow the new ships to equip a diesel engine on the central shaft. This would substantially increase the cruising range, and would ease the transfer of fuel and reduce the number of crew needed to operate the ships' machinery. The navy department also argued for an increase in the main battery guns, from 28-centimeter (11 in) guns to 30.5 cm (12 in) weapons. Since the German battlecruisers were intended to fight in the line of battle, their armament needed to be sufficiently powerful to penetrate the armor of their British opponents. Weight increases were managed by reducing the number of guns, from 10 to 8—the increase in gun caliber added only 36 tons to the ships' displacement. Tirpitz argued against the increase in gun caliber, for he thought the 28 cm gun was powerful enough.

A new construction technique was employed to save weight. Previous battlecruisers were built with a combination of transverse and longitudinal steel frames; the -class ships dispensed with the transverse frames and used only the longitudinal ones. This enabled the ship to retain structural strength and a lower weight. As with all preceding capital ships, the outer hull spaces between the hull wall and the torpedo bulkhead were used for coal storage.

On 1 September 1910, the design board chose the 30.5 cm, to be mounted in four twin turrets on the centerline of the ship. In the meantime, pressure from the British public and media had forced the British Parliament to step up ship building. Kaiser Wilhelm II requested that the build time for the new battlecruisers be reduced to two years each, as opposed to three years. This proved unfeasible, because neither the armor or armament firms could supply the necessary materials according to an expedited schedule.

General characteristics 

The ships' hulls were constructed from longitudinal steel frames, over which the outer hull plates were riveted. s hull contained 16 watertight compartments, though  and  had an additional seventeenth compartment. All three ships had a double bottom that ran for 65% of the length of the hull. This was a decrease from preceding German battlecruisers, which had a double bottom for at least 75% of the hull.

The ships were regarded as excellent sea boats by the German navy. The -class ships were described as having had gentle motion, though they were "wet" at the casemate deck. The ships lost up to 65% speed with the twin rudders hard over, and heeled up to 11 degrees. The standard crew for one of the vessels was 44 officers and 1,068 men; when serving as the flagship for the I Scouting Group, the ships carried an additional 14 officers and 62 men. The s carried smaller craft, including one picket boat, three barges, two launches, two yawls, and two dinghies.

Machinery 
By the time construction work on  began, it was determined that the diesel engine was not ready for use. Instead, the plan to use a three-shaft system was abandoned and the ships reverted to the standard four-shaft arrangement. Each set consisted of a high- and low-pressure turbine—the high-pressure machines drove the outer shafts while the low-pressure turbines turned the inner pair. Steam was supplied to the turbines from 14 coal-fired marine-type double boilers and eight oil-fired marine-type double-ended boilers. Each ship was equipped with a pair of turbo-electric generators and a pair of diesel-electric generators that provided a total of 1,660 kilowatts at 220 volts. Each ship was equipped with two rudders.

The engines for first two ships were designed to provide , at 280 revolutions per minute.

Armament 

The -class ships were armed with eight 30.5 cm (12 in) SK L/50 guns in four twin gun turrets, two forward of the main superstructure in a superfiring pair and two to the rear of the ship, in a similar arrangement. The turrets were trained with electric motors, while the guns were elevated hydraulically, up to 13.5 degrees. The guns fired 405.5-kilogram (894 lb) armor-piercing shells at a muzzle velocity of 855 meters per second (2,805 ft/s). The turrets were modified in 1916 to increase the elevation maximum to 16 degrees. The ships carried 720 shells, or 90 per gun; each gun was supplied with 65 armor-piercing (AP) shells and 25 semi-AP shells for use against targets with less armor protection. The 30.5 cm gun had a rate of fire of between 2–3 shells per minute, and was expected to fire 200 shells before replacement was necessary. The guns were also capable of firing 405.9 kg (894.8 lb) high explosive shells. The shells were loaded with two RP C/12 propellant charges: a main charge in a brass cartridge that weighed 91 kg (201 lb) and a fore charge in a silk bag that weighed 34.5 kg (76 lb). The propellant magazines were located underneath the shell rooms for the two forward turrets as well as the rear superfiring turret; the arrangement was reversed for the rearmost turret.

The ships were designed to carry a secondary armament of fourteen  SK L/45 guns, mounted in casemates along the superstructure. The guns had a sustained rate of fire of five to seven rounds per minute. The shells were 45.3 kg (99.8 lb), and were loaded with a 13.7 kg (31.2 lb) RPC/12 propellant charge in a brass cartridge. The guns fired at a muzzle velocity of 835 meters per second (2,740 ft/s). The guns were expected to fire around 1,400 shells before they needed to be replaced.

The three ships carried a variety of  SK L/45 guns in several configurations. The -class ships were initially equipped with eight of these weapons, all in single mounts; four were placed in the forward superstructure and four in the aft superstructure. After 1916, the four 8.8 cm guns in the forward superstructure were removed. The Flak guns were emplaced in MPL C/13 mountings, which allowed depression to −10 degrees and elevation to 70 degrees.

The ships were also armed with submerged torpedo tubes in their hulls.  was equipped with four 50 cm tubes; the later ships were armed with more powerful 60 cm weapons. The tubes were arranged with one in the bow, one in the stern, and two on the broadside. s 50 cm torpedoes were the G7 type, 7.02 m (276 in) long and armed with a 195 kg (430 lb) Hexanite warhead. The torpedo had a range of 4,000 m (4,370 yd) when set at a speed of 37 knots, and up to 9,300 m (10,170 yd) at 27 knots. The 60 cm torpedoes were the H8 type, which were 8 m long and carried a 210 kg (463 lb) Hexanite warhead. The torpedoes had a range of 6,000 m (6,550 yd) when set at a speed of 36 knots; at a reduced speed of 30 knots, the range increased significantly to 14,000 m (15,310 yd).

Armor 

The -class ships were protected with Krupp cemented steel armor, as was the standard for German warships of the period. This included the ammunition magazines and the machinery spaces. The belt was reduced in less critical areas, to  forward and  aft.

Construction 

Of the three ships in its class, only  was ordered as an addition to the fleet, under the provisional name "K".

 was constructed at Blohm & Voss in Hamburg under construction number 213. She was the least expensive of the three ships, at a cost of 56 million gold marks. The ship was ready to be launched on 14 June 1913, but during the ceremony, one of the wooden sledges upon which the hull rested became jammed. It took until 12 July for her to enter the water. She was commissioned into the High Seas Fleet on 1 September 1914, shortly after the outbreak of World War I.  was built at the Schichau dockyard in Danzig under construction number 885, at the cost of 58 million gold marks. The ship was launched on 29 November 1913, and after lengthy trials, commissioned on 8 August 1915. , the final member of the class, was built at the Imperial Dockyard in Wilhelmshaven, under construction number 34. The ship was built at a cost of 59 million gold marks, the most expensive of the three vessels. She was launched on 1 August 1915 and commissioned on 10 May 1917.

Ships of the class

Service history

SMS  
Named after Georg von Derfflinger, a German field marshal during the Thirty Years' War,  was commissioned on 1 September 1914. A dockyard crew transferred the ship from Hamburg to Kiel, via the Skagen. The ship was assigned to the I Scouting Group at the end of October. Damage to the ship's turbines sustained during trials prevented the ship from seeing active service until 16 November. On 15 December, the ship took part in the raid on Scarborough, Hartlepool and Whitby. She was also present during the battle of Dogger Bank on 24 January 1915. The ship was hit once by a 13.5-inch shell from one of the British battlecruisers; in response, she heavily damaged . Repair work was completed by 16 February, but s starboard turbine was accidentally damaged on 28 June, and the ship was again in the dockyard until August. On 24 April 1916,  took part in the bombardment of Yarmouth.

On 31 May,  was heavily engaged during the Battle of Jutland, as the second ship in the German battlecruiser line. She sustained 21 major hits during the battle, but dealt considerable damage to the British battlecruiser force as well. Two hours later, at 18:30,  suffered a similar fate, though  was assisted by her sister . During the engagement,  had both of her rear turrets knocked out by British gunfire. Her crew suffered 157 men killed and 26 wounded, which was the highest casualty figure for any German ship not sunk. The resilience of the vessel earned her the nickname "Iron Dog" from her British adversaries. Repair work lasted until 15 October, during which the ship had her pole mast removed and replaced with a tripod mast. The ship conducted training operations until November, at which point she returned to active duty with the fleet.

Following the German capitulation in November 1918,  was interned with a significant portion of the High Seas Fleet in Scapa Flow. On 21 June 1919, with the guard ships of the Royal Navy out on maneuvers, Rear Admiral Ludwig von Reuter ordered that the fleet be scuttled. The resulting scuttling of the German fleet saw some 66 vessels of various types sunk. The ship was raised in 1939 to be broken up for scrap metal, but the outbreak of World War II intervened. The ship, which remained capsized, was anchored off the island of Risa until 1946, at which point she was sent to Faslane Port, where she was broken up. The ship's bell was delivered to the German Federal Navy on 30 August 1965.

SMS  

 was named after Ludwig Adolf Wilhelm von Lützow, a Prussian lieutenant-general who fought during the Napoleonic Wars. The ship was commissioned on 8 August 1915, and then underwent trials. On 25 October, while still running sea trials, s port low pressure turbine was severely damaged. She was sent to Kiel for repairs, which lasted until late January 1916. The ship went on additional trials that lasted until 19 February.  was by then fully operational, and assigned to I Scouting Group on 20 March 1916. She took part in two fleet advances, on 25 March and 21–22 April, without any major incidents. While en route to the target, Vice Admiral Franz von Hipper's flagship  was heavily damaged by mines. As a result,  was transferred to the role of squadron flagship. During the operation, the German battlecruisers encountered British light forces, and a running battle ensued.  engaged the light cruiser  and hit her several times.

At the Battle of Jutland, she was the first ship in the German line, and Hipper's flagship, and drew fire from the British battlecruisers which included hits below her waterline. Shortly after the start of the battlecruiser action,  hit her opponent Lion several times; one hit knocked out Lions "Q" turret, and the resulting magazine fire nearly destroyed the ship. Shortly after 19:00, the armored cruisers  and  inadvertently ran into the German line;  opened fire immediately, followed by several German dreadnoughts. In a hail of shells, Defences ammunition magazines detonated and the ship was sunk. At around the same time, the fresh battlecruisers of the 3rd Battlecruiser Squadron engaged their German opposites. Between 19:26 and 19:34,  sustained four 12-inch shell hits in her bow from the British battlecruisers; these eventually proved to be fatal. By 20:15,  had been hit five more times, including hits on her two forward turrets.

By 22:15,  had shipped nearly 2,400 tons of water, and the ship was dangerously down by the bows. After midnight, attempts were made to steer the ship in reverse. This failed when the bow became submerged enough to bring the stern out of the water; by 02:20, the screws and both rudders were coming out of the water and the ship was no longer able to steer. The order to abandon ship was given, and at 02:47,  was sunk by the torpedo boat . The ship was lost because the flooding in the bow could not be controlled; the forward pump system failed and the central system could not keep up with the rising water. The crew was picked up by four torpedo boats that had been escorting the crippled battlecruiser; during the battle the ship suffered 116 men killed.

SMS  

 was the last battlecruiser completed for the Imperial German Navy, and as such had a very short career. The raid was brief; by the time  and  arrived on the scene, the British ships had broken off the attack and withdrawn. Six days later,  replaced  as flagship of I Scouting Group. On 23 April 1918, the ship took part in an abortive fleet advance into the North Sea that attempted to intercept an Allied convoy.  sustained mechanical damage while en route, and as a result, Vice Admiral Hipper decided to cancel the operation. On 11 August, Hipper was promoted to Admiral and given command of the entire High Seas Fleet. Rear Admiral Ludwig von Reuter replaced Hipper as the commander of I Scouting Group; he raised his flag on  the following day.

 was interned at Scapa Flow, along with her sister  and the rest of the German battlecruisers. She was scuttled on 21 June 1919, and sank at 17:00. Several unsuccessful attempts to raise her were made; on 23 July 1930 the ship was finally raised. From 1930 to 1932 she was scrapped at Rosyth. Her bell was presented to the German Federal Navy on 28 May 1959.

Notes

Footnotes

Citations

References

Online sources

Further reading
 
 
 
 
 

Battlecruiser classes
 
World War I battlecruisers of Germany